Ruud Jorge Boffin (born 5 November 1987) is a Belgian professional footballer who plays as a goalkeeper for Süper Lig club Antalyaspor.

Career

Early career
Born in Sint-Truiden, Boffin began his career with the youth team of Racing Genk, before moving to Dutch team PSV in 2005. Boffin never made a senior appearance for PSV, and began his professional career on loan at FC Eindhoven during the 2007–08 season. Boffin moved to MVV Maastricht in 2008, and spent the second half of the 2009–10 season on loan at VVV-Venlo. Boffin made a total of 86 League appearances in Dutch football.

West Ham United
Boffin signed for English team West Ham United on 1 September 2010, on a two-year deal, alongside fellow new signing Lars Jacobsen. Boffin signed for an undisclosed nominal fee following a trial for the club, and was announced as cover for Robert Green. Boffin made his West Ham debut on 18 December 2010, in the 1–1 Premier League draw against Blackburn Rovers. In April 2012 having found his playing opportunities infrequent due to the form of Robert Green and the signing of Stephen Henderson, Boffin's contract was cancelled by mutual consent. Boffin made one League and two Cup appearances for West Ham.

Eskişehirspor

In May 2012, he signed for Turkish club Eskişehirspor. On 25 September 2016, he scored a goal by a direct free-kick from his own half at TFF First League game against Ümraniyespor, which ended 2–0.

Antalyaspor
After having played in the second-tier TFF First League with Eskişehirspor, Boffin signed with Süper Lig club Antalyaspor in 2017. In his first season, he had to share his playing time with Ferhat Kaplan, but he soon grew into the starter. In 2021, he reached the final of the Turkish Cup for the second time in his career.

References

External links
 
 

1987 births
Living people
People from Sint-Truiden
Belgian footballers
Belgian expatriate footballers
Association football goalkeepers
K.R.C. Genk players
PSV Eindhoven players
FC Eindhoven players
MVV Maastricht players
VVV-Venlo players
West Ham United F.C. players
Eskişehirspor footballers
Antalyaspor footballers
Eredivisie players
Eerste Divisie players
Premier League players
Süper Lig players
TFF First League players
Expatriate footballers in England
Belgian expatriate sportspeople in England
Expatriate footballers in the Netherlands
Belgian expatriate sportspeople in the Netherlands
Expatriate footballers in Turkey
Belgian expatriate sportspeople in Turkey
Footballers from Limburg (Belgium)